The Gudalur Janmam Estates (Abolition and Conversion into Ryotwari) of 1969 was an act aiming at vesting of agricultural land to the cultivators and was specially created for the Gudalur Taluk of Nilgiris District in Tamil Nadu State in India. The Act passed by the Tamil Nadu State Legislature as Act 24/1969.This was also included in the ninth schedule of the Constitution. Section 3 of the said Act was for vesting the private forest with the State Government and this provision was struck down by the Court as unconstitutional. to overcome the Court Judgment, this Act was placed in the 9th Schedule of the Constitution of India. A Bench of Supreme Court held that the purpose of the Act, enacted by the Tamil Nadu government, was meant to do away with hereditary ship.

Act
This act is placed in the Ninth Schedule of the Constitution of India as entry number 80. Therefore, it is exempt from constitutional challenge on civil right grounds

See also
 Tamil Nadu Government Laws & Rules

References

External links
www.tn.gov.in policy note

Tamil Nadu state legislation